Pike River is a municipality in Brome-Missisquoi Regional County Municipality in the Montérégie region of Quebec, Canada. The population as of the Canada 2011 Census was 525.

Until May 5, 2012 it was known as Saint-Pierre-de-Véronne-à-Pike-River.

Demographics

Population
Population trend:

Language
Mother tongue language (2006)

Photo gallery

See also
List of municipalities in Quebec

References 

Municipalities in Quebec
Incorporated places in Brome-Missisquoi Regional County Municipality